Richard Carl Westmoreland (born February 17, 1941) is a former college and professional American football defensive back. In 1963, he joined the San Diego Chargers of the American Football League. He played for the Chargers and the Miami Dolphins for seven seasons and was an AFL All-Star selection in 1967. Westmoreland holds the Miami Dolphins team records for most interceptions in a season (10, 1967), (since tied with Xavien Howard) and most consecutive games with an interception (5, Games 9 through 13 in 1967).

See also
Other American Football League players

North Carolina A&T Aggies football players
San Diego Chargers players
Miami Dolphins players
1941 births
Living people
American football defensive backs
American Football League All-Star players
Players of American football from Charlotte, North Carolina
American Football League players